Gilbert Delahaye (19 March 1923 – 6 December 1997) was a Belgian author.  He is best known for the Martine books, a series of illustrated children's stories he prepared with artist Marcel Marlier.

In popular culture
His book, Martine à la ferme, appears in the 2002 French film, L'Auberge espagnole. A principal character in the film (Audrey Tautou) states that she was named after Delahaye's Martine.

External links
 Gilbert Delahaye at Service du Livre Luxembourgeois 
 La farandole des animaux. Poésies et comptines at Decitre 

1923 births
1997 deaths
Belgian writers in French